Jannela Blonbou (born 4 October 1998) is a French handballer who plays for OGC Nice and the France national team.

International honours
EHF Junior European Championship:
Gold Medalist: 2017

Awards and recognition
 All-Star Right Back of the EHF Junior European Championship: 2017

References
 

   
1998 births
Living people 
French female handball players
21st-century French women